Luis Sosa may refer to:

 Luis Sosa (cyclist) (born 1949), Uruguayan cyclist
 Luis Sosa (gymnast) (born 1987), Mexican gymnast
 Luis Sosa (volleyball) (born 1995), Cuban volleyball player